Frank Milan Berger (June 25, 1913 - March 18, 2008) was a Czechoslovakian pharmacologist who discovered meprobamate, carisoprodol, and felbamate, while working at Wallace Laboratories.

He also discovered the 'tranquilising' effects of mephenesin in rodents while working at a laboratory in the United Kingdom, and campaigned against the advertising of medications in the mass media.

References 

1913 births
2008 deaths
Scientists from Plzeň
Czechoslovak pharmacologists
Charles University alumni